Thorius minutissimus is a species of salamander in the family Plethodontidae. It is endemic to Mexico. It is known only from one site near Santo Tomás Teipan in the Sierra Madre del Sur of Oaxaca, in pine–oak forest at 2,458 meters elevation. Its extent of occurrence (EOO) is 10 km2, which represents the single location.

It is threatened by habitat loss.

References

Endemic amphibians of Mexico
minutissimus
Fauna of the Sierra Madre del Sur
Amphibians described in 1949
Taxonomy articles created by Polbot